John Wesley Stiles was an American colonel and inventor who commanded the 83rd New York Infantry Regiment throughout the early years of the American Civil War as well as commander of the 3rd Brigade of James B. Ricketts' Second Division of the III Corps as well as being a renowned inventor at the American Institute of the City of New York.

Biography

Early years
John was born at New York City on January 31, 1811 as the son of Oratha Stiles and Elizabeth Billings. During his early years, Stiles would be educated at New York City as well as primarily work in the ship chandlery business at New York City. Stiles married Elizabeth Fisher Taylor on 1836 and had a total of 9 children with her. He also formed a partnership with Marshall O. Roberts before setting out on his own business. On 1858, he reportedly switched industries to the wood industry as he was a dealer for dye woods.

American Civil War
Stiles registered in the 9th New York state Militia as its colonel on May 16, 1861 and was later commissioned to be assigned as the main colonel of the 83rd New York Infantry Regiment after relieving the 7th Infantry Regiment. During his service with the 83rd New York, Stiles would participate at the Battle of Harpers Ferry, the Battle of Cedar Mountain, the First Battle of Rappahannock Station and the Battle of Thoroughfare Gap. He was later appointed as commander of the 3rd brigade of Nathaniel P. Banks and in 1862, was assigned to be the commander of the 3rd Brigade of James B. Ricketts' Second Division of the  III Corps of the Army of Virginia. He then lead the 3rd Brigade into the Second Battle of Bull Run, the Battle of Chantilly,  After that however, he was discharged from service on January 1863 due to injuries. He was then replaced by Lt. Col Hendrickson.

Post-War Life
Stiles returned to New York City with his health in shambles and could no longer continue being a ship chandler but with his new interest in mechanics made him become a inventor and managed to win the gold medal at the American Institute of the City of New York in 1884. One of his daughters stated:

Stiles died on September 15, 1885 and was buried at Green-Wood Cemetery.

References

1811 births
1885 deaths
People of New York (state) in the American Civil War
Union Army colonels
Military personnel from New York City
Military personnel from New York (state)
19th-century American inventors
Burials at Green-Wood Cemetery